The term religious right may refer to religiously motivated right-wing or conservative movements such as:
Religious conservatism
Christian right
Jewish right
Hindu nationalism (Hindutva, Sangh Parivar)
Nippon Kaigi

See also
Islamic fundamentalism
Religious fundamentalism
Religious left
Religious rite (disambiguation)